Julia Hickelsberger-Füller (born 1 August 1999), known as Julia Hickelsberger, is an Austrian footballer who plays as a midfielder for German Bundesliga club TSG 1899 Hoffenheim since Summer 2022 and the Austria women's national team.

International goals

References

1999 births
Living people
Women's association football midfielders
Austrian women's footballers
Austria women's international footballers
SV Neulengbach (women) players
FSK St. Pölten-Spratzern players
TSG 1899 Hoffenheim (women) players
ÖFB-Frauenliga players
UEFA Women's Euro 2022 players
Austrian expatriate women's footballers
Austrian expatriate sportspeople in Germany
Expatriate women's footballers in Germany
People from Sankt Pölten
Footballers from Lower Austria